BBC Radio 1 Live in Concert is a live album by the band Stiff Little Fingers, released in 1994 (see 1994 in music).

Track listing 
 "Roots, Radicals, Rockers and Reggae"  (Stiff Little Fingers)   – 4:03
 "Just Fade Away"  (Ogilvie, Stiff Little Fingers)   – 3:05
 "Safe As Houses"  (Ogilvie, Stiff Little Fingers)   – 5:43
 "Gate 49"  (Ogilvie, Stiff Little Fingers)   – 2:31
 "Hits & Misses"  (Ogilvie, Stiff Little Fingers)   – 3:59
 "The Only One"  (Ogilvie, Stiff Little Fingers)   – 4:23
 "Silver Lining"  (Ogilvie, Stiff Little Fingers)  – 3:06
 "Piccadilly Circus"  (Ogilvie, Stiff Little Fingers)   – 4:54

Personnel 
Stiff Little Fingers
 Jake Burns – vocals, guitar
 Dolphin Taylor – drums
 Henry Cluney – guitar
 Bruce Foxton – bass

References 

BBC Radio recordings
1993 live albums
Stiff Little Fingers live albums